Richard Molyneux, 1st Viscount Molyneux (1594–1636) was an English politician who sat in the House of Commons at various times between 1614 and 1629.

Biography
Molyneux was the son of Sir Richard Molyneux, 1st Baronet of Sefton and his wife Frances Gerard, the daughter of Sir Gilbert Gerard and Anne Ratcliffe. He matriculated at Brasenose College, Oxford on 24 November 1609, at the age of 15. He was knighted on 27 March 1613. In 1614, he was elected Member of Parliament for Wigan. He held the office of Receiver-General of the Duchy of Lancaster from 1616. He succeeded to the Molyneux baronetcy as the 2nd Baronet on the death of his father on 8 February 1622.

In 1625 and 1628 Molyneux was elected MP for Lancashire. On 22 December 1628 he was created Viscount Molyneux by King Charles I (taking his seat in the Irish House of Lords on 4 November 1634). In the same year, he was appointed Deputy Lieutenant of Lancashire but noted as a recusant and non communicant. According to Gerald Aylmer, Molyneux was one of only two Royalist gentry in the county of Lancashire who held an important office of state during the period 1625–1642  (?) to 1636.

Family
Molyneux married Mary (1596 – before 21 June 1639), daughter of Sir Thomas Caryll of Bentons, Shipley, West Sussex, in about 1618. His widow remarried, to Raphael Tarterau, Carver to the Queen Consort (he survived her).

Molyneux was succeeded by his son Richard Molyneux, 2nd Viscount Molyneux. His daughter Charlotte married Sir William Stanley, Bt, of Hooton and his daughter Mary became the wife of Sir John Gage, Bt, of Firle, Sussex.

Molyneux's brother, Sir Vivian Molyneux, was a scholar, traveller and Royalist agent in the 1640s, and an uncle of Robert Dormer, 1st Earl of Carnarvon, Lord Lieutenant of Buckinghamshire.

Notes

References

 

1594 births
1636 deaths
Viscounts in the Peerage of Ireland
Peers of Ireland created by Charles I
Deputy Lieutenants of Lancashire
English MPs 1614
English MPs 1625
English MPs 1628–1629
Members of the Parliament of England (pre-1707) for Lancashire